Albert Montañés won the title, beating Potito Starace 6–2, 6–4

Seeds

Draw

Finals

Top half

Bottom half

References
 Main Draw
 Qualifying Draw

Internazionali di Tennis del Friuli Venezia Giulia - Singles
Internazionali di Tennis del Friuli Venezia Giulia
Friuli